The City Municipality of Maribor, also the City of Maribor (acronym MOM), is one of twelve city municipalities in Slovenia. Its seat is Maribor, the second-largest city in Slovenia. The population of the municipality was 113,778 in January 2021.

Settlements

In addition to the municipal seat of Maribor, the municipality also includes the following settlements:

 Bresternica
 Celestrina
 Dogoše
 Gaj nad Mariborom
 Grušova
 Hrastje
 Hrenca
 Jelovec
 Kamnica
 Laznica
 Limbuš
 Malečnik
 Meljski Hrib
 Metava
 Nebova
 Pekel
 Pekre
 Počehova
 Razvanje
 Ribniško Selo
 Rošpoh – part
 Ruperče
 Šober
 Srednje
 Trčova
 Vinarje
 Vodole
 Vrhov Dol
 Za Kalvarijo
 Zgornji Slemen – part
 Zrkovci

References

External links

City Municipality of Maribor on Geopedia

 
Maribor
1994 establishments in Slovenia